Octahydrotriborate is the boron hydride B3H8−.  It forms a variety of salts that are colorless and air-stable.  The  tetrabutylammonium salt is soluble in organic solvents such as acetonitrile and methylene chloride.  The anion is an intermediate is the synthesis of various higher boron hydrides, such as pentaborane(9).  B3H8− can be viewed as the conjugate base of triborane B3H9.

Preparation
Octahydrotriborate is prepared by partial oxidation of borohydride with iodine or boron trifluoride:
3BH4−  +  I2  →  B3H8−  +  2H2  +  2I−
5BH4−  +  4BF3O(C2H5)2  →  2B3H8−  +  2H2  +  4O(C2H5)2  + 3BF4−

Structure and reactions
As shown by X-ray crystallography of various salts, B3H8− consists of a distorted triangle of three BH2 vertices. Two edges of the triangle are occupied by bridging hydrides. 

It is converted to the bromide B3H7Br− using HBr (illustrating its hydridic character):
B3H8−  + HBr  →   B3H7Br−  + H2
Pyrolysis of this bromide gives pentaborane(9). 
5 B3H7Br−   →   3 B5H9  +  5 Br−  +  4 H2

Also consistent with its basicity, B3H8_ functions as a bidentate ligand in a variety of coordination complexes, e.g. Cr(B3H8)2.

References

Borohydrides